The European jackal (Canis aureus moreoticus) is a subspecies of the golden jackal present in Anatolia, the Caucasus, and Southeast Europe. It was first described by French naturalist Isidore Geoffroy Saint-Hilaire during the Morea expedition. There were an estimated 70,000 jackals in Europe according to one source; another source gives an estimate of 97,000 to 117,000 individuals. Though mostly found in southeastern Europe, its range has grown to encompass parts of the Baltic in northeastern Europe, Italy, with more recent sightings in Western Europe (France, Germany, Poland, and several other countries in the area report European jackals as vagrants.). One theory, which has been set forth to explain the rapid spread of the species since the 1970s to colonise European areas in which they were perhaps likely never historically native, is that grey wolf populations are less abundant than in the historic past.

Physical description
The European subspecies, consistent with Bergmann's rule, is the largest of the golden jackals, with animals of both sexes measuring 120–125 cm (47–49 in) in total length and 10–13 kg (20–29 lb) in body weight. One adult male in North-Eastern Italy is recorded to have reached 14.9 kg (33 lb). The fur is coarse, and is generally brightly coloured with blackish tones on the back. The thighs, upper legs, ears and forehead are bright reddish chestnut. Jackals in Northern Dalmatia have broader than average skulls, which is thought to result from human induced isolation from other populations, thus resulting in a new morphotype.

Diet
In the Caucasus, jackals mainly hunt hares, small rodents, pheasants, partridges, ducks, coots, moorhens and passerines. They readily eat lizards, snakes, frogs, fish, molluscs and insects. During the winter period, they will kill many nutrias and waterfowl. During such times, jackals will surplus kill and cache what they do not eat. Jackals will feed on fruits, such as pears, hawthorn, dogwood and the cones of common medlars. Golden jackals tend not to be as damaging to livestock as wolves and red foxes are, though they can become a serious nuisance to small sized stock when in high numbers. The highest number of livestock damages occurred in southern Bulgaria: 1,053 attacks on small stock, mainly sheep and lambs, were recorded between 1982–87, along with some damages to newborn deer in game farms.

In Greece, rodents, insects, carrion, and fruits comprise the jackal's diet, though they rarely eat garbage, due to large numbers of stray dogs preventing them access to places with high human density. Jackals in Turkey have been known to eat the eggs of the endangered green sea-turtle. In Hungary, their most frequent prey are common voles and bank voles. In Dalmatia, mammals (the majority being even-toed ungulates and lagomorphs) made up 50.3% of the golden jackal's diet, fruit seeds (14% each being common fig and common grape vine, while 4.6% are Juniperus oxycedrus) and vegetables 34.1%, insects (16% orthopteras, 12% beetles, and 3% dictyopteras) 29.5%, birds and their eggs 24.8%, artificial food 24%, and branches, leaves, and grass 24%. Information on the diet of jackals in northeastern Italy is scant, but it is certain that they prey on small roe deer and hares.

Distribution
The jackal's current European range mostly encompasses the Balkan region, where the population had been reduced in many areas by the 1960s, with core populations occurring in scattered regions such as Strandja, the Dalmatian Coast, Aegean Macedonia and the Peloponnese. It recolonised its former territories in Bulgaria during 1962, following legislative protection, and subsequently expanded its range into Romania and Serbia. Individual jackals further expanded into Italy, Slovenia, Austria, Hungary and Slovakia during the 1980s. The golden jackal is listed as an Annex V species in the EU Habitats Directive and as such may be hunted or killed in Estonia, Greece and all other EU member states, should these states allow this based on their own laws, but the population must be monitored and submitted to the European Commission every six years.

Balkans and further east
Bulgaria has the largest jackal population in Europe, which went through a 33–fold increase in range from the early sixties to mid-eighties. Factors aiding this increase include the replacement of natural forests with dense scrub, an increase in animal carcasses from state game farms, reductions in wolf populations and the abandonment of poisoning campaigns. In the early 1990s, it was estimated that up to 5000 jackals populated Bulgaria. The population increased in 1994, and appears to have stabilised.

In Greece, as of 2013 golden jackals are the rarest of the three wild extant canids there, having disappeared from central Greece, western Greece and Corfu, they are now limited to disjunct, isolated population clusters in Peloponnese, Phocis, Samos Island, Halkidiki and north-eastern Greece. Currently the largest population cluster is located in Nestos, north-eastern Greece. Although listed as 'vulnerable' in the Red Data Book for Greek Vertebrates, the species has neither been officially declared as a game species nor as a protected one.

In Turkey, Romania, the North Black Sea coast, and the Caucasus region, the status of jackals was largely unknown in 2004. There were indications of expanding populations in Romania and the north-western Black Sea coast, and reports of decline in Turkey.

Jackal populations have been increasing in Serbia since the late 1970s, and occur mainly in north-eastern Serbia and lower Srem. Jackals are especially common near Negotin and Bela Palanka (close to the border with Bulgaria), where during the 1990s, about 500 specimens were shot. In Croatia, a 2007 survey reported 19 jackal packs in the north-western part of Ravni Kotari and two on Vir Island. In Bosnia and Herzegovina, jackals were a rare species (from 1920 to 1999 only a few observations in the south of the country) but at the beginning of this century their significant presence in the north of the country is an obvious example of expansion of the jackals on the European continent. Jackal populations in Albania however are on the verge of extinction with possible occurrence in only three lowland wetland locations along the Adriatic Sea.

Central and western Europe
Golden jackals are listed as a protected species in Slovenia, where they were first spotted in 1952 and have also established permanent territories there. In 2005, a probably vagrant female was accidentally shot near Gornji Grad in the Upper Savinja Valley, Northern Slovenia. In 2009, two territorial groups of golden jackal were recorded in the Ljubljana Marsh area, Central Slovenia. It seems that the species continues to expand towards Central Europe.

In Italy, the species is found in the wild in Friuli Venezia Giulia, Veneto, and Trentino-Alto Adige/Südtirol. In the High Adriatic Hinterland, its distribution has been recently updated by Lapini et al. (2009). In 1984 Canis aureus had reached the Province of Belluno; in 1985, a pack reproduced near Udine (this group was eliminated in 1987); a road-killed jackal was collected in Veneto in 1992, and their presence was then confirmed in the Province of Gorizia, and in the hinterland of the Gulf of Trieste. In these cases, the specimens were usually roaming male subadults, though a family-group was discovered in Agordino in 1994. A young dead female was discovered on 10 December 2009 in Carnia, indicating that the species' range has continued to expand. Moreover, in the late summer of 2009, the species was also signalled in Trentino-Alto Adige/Südtirol, where it has likely reached the Puster Valley. The Italian branch of WWF estimates that jackal numbers in Italy may be underestimated. The golden jackal is a protected animal in Italy.

There have been records of a presence of golden jackals around Geneva in Switzerland since 2011, a camera trap photographed one in 2018. In 2019 the authorities of the Republic and Canton of Geneva revealed the first video footage of one in Switzerland.

In Hungary, golden jackals had disappeared in the 1950s through hunting and habitat destruction, only to return in the late 1970s, with the first breeding pairs being detected near the southern border in Transdanubia, then between the River Danube and Tisza. Golden jackals have since increased greatly in number year by year, with some estimates indicating that they now outnumber red foxes. The sighting of a jackal near the Austrian border in the summer of 2007 indicated that they have spread throughout the country.

There have been repeated sightings of jackals in eastern Austria for a few decades. In 2007 the first reproduction was reported in the national park Neusiedler See – Seewinkel. It has since been seen in the western and southern parts of the country, in South Tyrol, Upper Austria, Carinthia and Styria. In 2019 it was spotted for the first time eastern Tyrol.

The presence of the animals in Germany has been confirmed since the very end of the 1990s. As of 2019 they have been sighted almost throughout the country. They are not thought to have been historically present in Germany before, according to experts warm winter weather may be contributing to their expansion into new territory. They have primarily been observed in nature parks. Despite the long presence in the country, jackals are not known to have formed territories, a pack or let alone breed in Germany. The closest known packs are in the Czech Republic and Austria, and it is quite possible vagrant animals are wandering hundreds of kilometres.

In Denmark the carcass of a roadkilled golden jackal was discovered in September 2015 near Karup in Central Jutland. In August 2016 a live golden jackal was spotted and photographed in Lille Vildmose.

In the Netherlands, presence of a single individual was confirmed through a camera trap at the Veluwe in 2016. Evidence of the presence of the species in this area came again from a camera trap in 2017. An observation in 2018 was revealed to be a marketing stunt. The next observation is from 2019 from a camera trap in Drenthe. The jackal in this country is thought to be as a neophyte: it is not known to have ever inhabited the area. A masters' thesis calculated a possible maximum carrying capacity of 5,000 animals in the Netherlands. Another ecologist, Glenn Lelieveld, remarked that the increasing population of wolves in the Netherlands might as yet have unforeseeable effects. He noted it might find more marshy areas to live, or be pushed out of the larger game parks into more agricultural areas. Lelieveld stressed that the species is still officially vagrant in the country. In order to prove if the species had settled in the country, he used microphones and human reports to find the howling sounds of the animals, and would then rush to the location with a megaphone playing back recordings of jackal howls. If the animals are truly settled in an area, they would howl in back at the recordings to mark their territory, but as of 2019 this had never occurred. The presence of the animal has proven much less sensational than the return of the wolf.
A golden jackal was photographed in late 2017 in Haute-Savoie, southeastern France.

A dead adult was found close to the road near Podolí (Uherské Hradiště District) in the Czech Republic, on 19 March 2006.

The species' presence in Poland was confirmed in 2015 through a necropsy on a roadkilled male found in the northwest and camera trapping of two live specimens in the east.

Northern Europe
In the beginning of the 21st century, an isolated population was confirmed in western Estonia, much further north than their earlier known range. Whether they were an introduced population or came through natural migration was unknown. The Environmental Board of Estonia classified it as an introduced species, and thus potentially subject to extermination campaigns. However, studies confirmed that animals reached Estonia naturally from Caucasus through Ukraine, which some people take to mean they should not be considered introduced species. They are now treated equally with other hunted animals in Estonia. The number of jackals has grown quickly in coastal areas of Estonia. In 2016 jackals killed over 100 sheep in Estonia and during hunting season in winter 2016/2017 32 jackals were killed. Due to quick growth of jackal population in 2017 their hunting season was extended by two months for next year, up to six months in a year.

In July 2020 a camera trap confirmed the presence of a golden jackal from Lakselv in Finnmark, Norway, representing the Northernmost occurrence of golden jackals to date. The specimen is thought to have migrated from Finland.

Origins and presence in European tradition
Although present in Europe, jackals are not commonly featured in European folklore or literature. In the former Greek speaking and writing parts of their distribution in the eastern Mediterranean coast were mentioned under the Greek name thos/θως till the Ottoman arrival and the use of the name tsakali/τσακάλι (from Turkish çakal). Ιn similes in the Iliad (dated around 8th century BC) they are described as tawny coloured, gathering together to stalk animals injured by hunters. When the injured animal collapses the jackals devour it until some lion appears and steals their prey. The ancient Greek philosopher Aristotle in 4th century BC wrote that jackals avoid lions and dogs, but they are friendly to people, not being afraid of them. He also stated that their inner parts are identical to those of the wolf, and that they change appearance from summer to winter. Hesychius of Alexandria (5th - 6th century AD) wrote that the jackal is a beast similar to the wolf. Theodosius the grammarian (8th century AD) wrote that θως is a beast species and that the agile/fast persons are thus called θοοί/thoi. With the exception of Greece where it was considered among the most common mammals, being a rare and elusive animal, the jackal was historically often assumed to be an introduced animal if it were sighted elsewhere. The population in Dalmatia was formerly believed to be an independent species Canis  dalmatinus. It was widely believed by the inhabitants of Korčula Island that African jackals were introduced to the island by the Republic of Venice to inflict damage on the Republic of Ragusa. When in 1929 a male jackal appeared on Premuda, the islanders believed that it was brought to the island "out of a sheer malice". Although this population was initially synonymised with what was once thought to be the North African  golden jackal (now recognised as the African Golden wolf), this origin for Dalmatian jackals was later proved unlikely, as their skulls bear less similarities to those canines from North Africa and Ethiopia, than those of the jackals from neighbouring Bosnia or Anatolia. Sir William Jardine thought that jackals were first transported to Europe through the Muslim conquests. However, the fossil record indicates that the golden jackal likely colonised the European continent from Asia during the Upper Holocene or late Pleistocene.

In 2015, during an attempt to understand the genetic identity of the rapidly expanding jackal populations in Europe, an international team of researchers examined 15 microsatellite markers and a 406 base-pair fragment of the mtDNA control region from the tissue samples of 97 specimens throughout Europe and Asia Minor. The results showed that  jackals from Europe have much lower haplotype diversity than those in Israel (where they have admixed with dogs, grey wolves and African wolves), and that they mostly descend from populations originating from the Caucasus. The highest level of haplotype diversity was found in Peloponnesian jackals, which may represent another relict population of Europe's original golden jackals prior to their extirpation elsewhere. Particular attention was paid to the genetics of Baltic jackals, as all Baltic states class the animal as an introduced species, and subject to hunting. It was found that jackals in Estonia originate from the south-eastern European population, whereas those in Lithuania are of Caucasian origin; this was concluded to render the hypothesis of an artificial introduction unlikely, and that their presence in both states was consistent with the natural northward expansion of both southeastern and eastern European populations.

Surveys taken in the High Adriatic hinterland indicate that the totality of people with first hand experience of jackals (hunters, game keepers and local people) regularly mistook red foxes affected by sarcoptic mange (or in a problematic state of moult) for golden jackals. The sighting of a true golden jackal however, was always referred to as a wolf, or a little wolf. This was verified both with photo-trapping sessions and with track studies, confirming previous observations on this matter. This erroneous and controversial perception of the golden jackal may be due to the fact that its presence is still not traditional, neither in Italian and Slovenian human culture, nor in hunting and game keeping traditions. Another difficulty for trackers is that unlike a wolf, which defecates in the middle of trails, golden jackals leave their scat under cover of bushes.

References

External links

 GOlden JAckal informal study Group in Europe (GOJAGE) 
 Golden Jackal project in Austria

Subspecies of Canis aureus
Jackal, Golden
Mammals of Turkey